Sir Peter Michael Kirk, (18 May 1928 – 17 April 1977) was a British writer, broadcaster, Conservative politician, minister in the governments of Alec Douglas-Home and Edward Heath, and leading European Parliamentarian.

Early life

The elder son and fourth child of Kenneth Escott Kirk (Bishop of Oxford, 1937-1954), he was educated at Marlborough and at Trinity College, Oxford, where he obtained an MA in modern history having first studied languages (including a period at the University of Bern studying Old High German). He attended the congress in the Hague in 1948 from which the European Movement sprang, and was President of the Oxford Union Society in 1949.

Career

In the early 1950s he was diplomatic correspondent on the Kemsley Newspapers (part of Ian Fleming's Mercury News Service), and after his election to Parliament he continued to write freelance with regular contributions to (among others) The Daily Telegraph, National and English Review, Blackwood's, The Spectator, and Trenton Times (USA), and from 1961, to German press and television.  He made documentary films for J. Arthur Rank and frequently broadcast on British radio and television.

At the 1955 general election, he was elected as Member of Parliament (MP) for Gravesend, defeating outgoing MP Sir Richard Acland, who had left the Labour Party to stand as an independent candidate. Kirk was re-elected in Gravesend at the 1959 election, but lost his seat at the 1964 general election to Labour's Albert Murray.

In February 1965, the former Conservative Chancellor and Deputy Prime Minister Rab Butler was elevated to the peerage and thereby gave up his parliamentary seat in Saffron Walden.  Kirk was the successful candidate at the March 1965 by-election, and retained the seat until his death.

Under Alec Douglas-Home's premiership, Kirk was Under-Secretary of State for War from 1963 to 1964. When the Conservatives regained power in 1970, Prime Minister Edward Heath appointed him as Under-Secretary for Defence for the Royal Navy from 1970 to 1973, during which time he visited every British naval establishment both at home and abroad. He led the first Tory delegation to the European Parliament in 1973, a mixed team of peers and MPs who retained their Parliamentary seats and workload on a dual mandate.

Kirk's main interests were in foreign affairs and defence, being a British Parliamentary representative on the Council of Europe from 1956-1963 and again from 1966-1970. He served on the British-American Parliamentary delegation and various committees of the Western European Union.  Having been too young to fight in World War II (although greatly affected by it), he heard Winston Churchill's call for a United States of Europe in September 1946, and devoted much of his career to bringing this about.  

He was opposed to the British intervention in Suez in 1956, but a strong supporter of Britain's entry into the then Common Market in 1973,and a leading campaigner to keep the country there in the 1975 referendum.  

A fluent German and French speaker, he particularly admired the way that the Germans had reconstructed their country and developed a peaceful, stable and well-run political system in the aftermath of 1945. At home he campaigned vigorously for the abolition of the death penalty.

He detested dictatorships of any kind and greatly lamented the loss of eastern Europe to communism; he was a firm believer that Europe's destiny included the communist states of eastern Europe, although he did not live to see them included in NATO or the European Union.

Death
Kirk was knighted in 1976. He had a heart attack that same year, and died from a second heart attack on 17 April 1977, at his home in Steeple Bumpstead. The by-election for his Saffron Walden seat was won by the Conservative candidate Alan Haselhurst. The Peter Kirk Memorial Fund was set up in his honour, to give scholarships to young people to study modern Europe and its institutions.

Personal life

A devout Anglican, he was a delegate to the World Council of Churches in Delhi in 1961. His publications included One Army Strong (Faith Press, 1958) and a monograph on T.S. Eliot in Thirteen for Christ (ed. Melville Harcourt, Sheed & Ward, 1963).

He was married in August 1950 to Elizabeth Mary, daughter of Richard Brockbank Graham and Gertrude (née Anson). They had three sons, including Matthew Kirk, who was later the British Ambassador to Finland.

References

External links 
 

1928 births
1977 deaths
20th-century British journalists
Alumni of Trinity College, Oxford
Conservative Party (UK) MEPs
Conservative Party (UK) MPs for English constituencies
English Anglicans
Knights Bachelor
MEPs for the United Kingdom 1973–1979
Ministers in the Macmillan and Douglas-Home governments, 1957–1964
People educated at Marlborough College
People from Steeple Bumpstead
Presidents of the Oxford Union
UK MPs 1955–1959
UK MPs 1959–1964
UK MPs 1964–1966
UK MPs 1966–1970
UK MPs 1970–1974
UK MPs 1974
UK MPs 1974–1979